CBC Montreal may refer to:

CBME-FM, CBC Radio One on 88.5 FM
CBM-FM, CBC Music on 93.5 FM
CBMT-DT, CBC Television on channel 6

See also
SRC Montréal (disambiguation)
Maison Radio-Canada, the main CBC/Radio-Canada premises in Montreal